Guiliam or Willem Backereel (1570 in Antwerp – 10 August 1626 in Rome), was a Flemish Baroque landscape painter.

Biography
According to Houbraken, who repeated the information from Joachim von Sandrart's Teutsche Academie, Willem Backereel was from a large painting family that always had a few brothers in Rome. Willem's brother Gillis Backereel lived with him in Rome, but returned to Antwerp, where he later died. Both brothers were known as landscape painters.

According to the RKD he was in Italy from 1605 onwards and was taught painting by his older brother Gillis. His Roman sketches of the Flavian Palace are similar to works by Cornelis van Poelenburch, Jan Asselijn and Jacob de Heusch.

References

 Willem Backereel in the online edition of Sandrart's "Teutsche Academie"
 Het Gulden Cabinet p 108

1570 births
1626 deaths
Flemish Baroque painters
Artists from Antwerp
Emigrants from the Holy Roman Empire to Italy